Fahner Höhe is a Verwaltungsgemeinschaft ("collective municipality") in the district of Gotha, in Thuringia, Germany. The seat of the Verwaltungsgemeinschaft is in Tonna.

The Verwaltungsgemeinschaft Fahner Höhe consists of the following municipalities:

Dachwig 
Döllstädt 
Gierstädt 
Großfahner 
Tonna

References

Verwaltungsgemeinschaften in Thuringia